Women have served in the United States House of Representatives, the lower chamber of the United States Congress, with the Senate being the upper chamber, since 1917 following the 1916 election of Republican Jeannette Rankin from Montana, the first woman in Congress. In total, 375 women have been U.S. representatives and seven more women have been non-voting delegates. As of March 7, 2023, there are 125 women in the U.S. House of Representatives (not including four female non-voting delegates), making women 28.7% of the total. Of the 382 women who have served in the House, 251 have been Democrats (including four from U.S. territories and the District of Columbia) and 131 have been Republicans (including three from U.S. territories, including pre-statehood Hawaii). One woman has been Speaker of the House, Democrat Nancy Pelosi of California.

Women have been elected to the House of Representatives from 48 of the 50 states. Montana became, in 1917, the first state to send a woman to Congress, and Vermont became, in 2023, the most recent state to do so. The states that have not elected a woman to the House of Representatives are Mississippi and North Dakota—though both have elected women to the United States Senate. Women have also been sent to Congress from 5 of the 6 territories of the United States; the only territory that has not sent a woman to the House of Representatives is the Northern Mariana Islands. California has elected more women to Congress than any other state, with 46 U.S. representatives elected since 1923. To date, no woman who has served in the House has ever previously been a senator, been elected to represent more than one state in non-consecutive elections, switched parties, or served as a third-party member in her career, though one was reelected as an Independent.

Pat Saiki and Martha Keys are currently the oldest living former female members at the age of 92.

Firsts

The 1st woman to be elected to Congress was Montana's Jeannette Rankin, a Republican, in the 1916 House elections; notably, this occurred before the ratification of the 19th Amendment in 1920, which prohibits states and the federal government from denying any citizen the right to vote because of that citizen's sex. On April 2, 1917, she took her oath of office along with the other members of the 65th Congress.

Mae Nolan entered the House of Representatives in 1923 as the first Catholic woman in either chamber of Congress. Clare Boothe Luce, who converted to the Catholic Church in 1946 before retiring as a Congresswoman, was the first female Catholic convert in either chamber.

Florence Prag Kahn entered the House of Representatives in 1925 as the first Jewish and thus non-Christian woman in either chamber of Congress.

Chase G. Woodhouse, born in Canada to American parents, entered the House of Representatives in 1945 as the first woman born outside the United States elected to either chamber of Congress. She went to become the first woman in congressional party leadership when elected secretary of the House Democratic Caucus in 1949. Lynn Morley Martin became the first Republican woman elected to a House leadership position as vice chair of the House Republican Conference in 1985.

Margaret Chase Smith became the first woman elected in both chambers of Congress; she first entered the House of Representatives in 1940, before her election into the Senate in 1948.

Representative Vera Buchanan died in 1955, making her the first woman in either chamber of Congress to die in office.

Patsy Mink, an Asian American, entered the House of Representatives in 1965 as the first woman of color in either chamber of Congress.

Shirley Chisholm entered the House of Representatives in 1969 as the first African-American woman in either chamber of Congress.

In 1969, Representative Charlotte Reid became the first woman to wear pants in the House of Representatives or Senate.

In 1973, Representative Yvonne Brathwaite Burke became the first member of either the House of Representatives or Senate to give birth while in office, and she was the first member of Congress to be granted maternity leave, with the birth of her daughter Autumn.

Mary Rose Oakar in 1977 became the first Arab-American elected to congress.

The gym of the House of Representatives (with the exception of its swimming pool) first opened to women in 1985, the gym having previously been male-only. The swimming pool opened to women in 2009, the pool having previously been male-only.

Barbara Vucanovich entered the House of Representatives in 1983 as the first Hispanic or Latina woman in either chamber of Congress.

Apart from single-member House delegations, the first all-woman delegation in either chamber of Congress was from Hawaii, in late 1990—Pat Saiki and Patsy Mink. They were also the first all-woman of color delegation in either chamber. In 2013, New Hampshire became the first state to have an all-woman delegation in both houses of Congress. 

Enid Greene Waldholtz entered the House of Representatives in 1995 as the first Mormon woman in that chamber; although she was the second woman in Congress, after Senator Paula Hawkins of Florida.

Jo Ann Emerson entered the House of Representatives in 1997 as the first and, so far, only woman (re)elected as neither a Democrat nor a Republican from any state to either chamber of Congress. She won two elections scheduled on November 5, 1996: a special election to fill out the remainder of her husband's term in the 104th Congress, and a general election for a full term in the 105th Congress. Emerson received the Republican nomination for the unexpired term; however, the party slot for the regular election was already filled by another contender. According to Missouri law, she was ineligible to run as a GOP candidate, so she sought reelection and won her first full term as an independent. Emerson was sworn into office as such before rejoining the Republicans a few days later.

Tammy Baldwin, a lesbian, entered the House of Representatives in 1999 as the first openly LGBT woman in either chamber of Congress. 

Nancy Pelosi, a Democrat, rose through the ranks of her party leadership to be elected House whip in 2002, before being elevated to House floor leader and minority leader the following year; making her both the first woman whip and the first woman floor leader in either chamber of Congress. On January 4, 2007, she became the first woman to serve as Speaker of the House. On January 3, 2019, Pelosi become the first woman to reclaim the speakership.

Mazie Hirono entered the House of Representatives in 2007 as one of the first two Buddhists (alongside Hank Johnson) and first Buddhist woman elected in either chamber of Congress.

In 2011, the House of Representatives got its first women's bathroom near the chamber (Room H-211 of the Capitol building); women in the Senate have had their own restroom off the Senate floor since 1993.

Tammy Duckworth, an Iraq War combat veteran, entered the House of Representatives in 2013 as the first woman with a disability in either chamber of Congress.

Tulsi Gabbard entered the House of Representatives in 2013 as the first Hindu person in either chamber of Congress. Kyrsten Sinema also entered the House that same year as the first openly bisexual person in either chamber of Congress. 

In the 2018 House elections, there was a wave of firsts elected to the House of Representatives for the 116th Congress. A record-breaking 103 women were elected or reelected to the House, causing many to call it the "Year of the Woman" in a reference to the first such year, the 1992 Senate elections. Sharice Davids and Deb Haaland became the first Native American women ever elected to either house of Congress. Ilhan Omar and Rashida Tlaib became the first Muslim women elected to either chamber, with Tlaib the first Palestinian-American woman elected to Congress and Omar the first Somali-American of either sex to be elected. Angie Craig became the first lesbian mother to be elected. Additionally, Alexandria Ocasio-Cortez and Donna Shalala became, respectively, the youngest and the oldest woman ever elected to Congress.

Also in 2018, Jacky Rosen became the first sitting female House one-termer to be elected to the Senate.

In 2020, Republican Stephanie Bice was elected to become the first Iranian-American and first woman of Iranian parentage in Congress, and her fellow Republican, Yvette Herrell, was also elected as the first Native American woman from the party in Congress. Additionally, Republicans Michelle Steel and Young Kim, and Democrat Marilyn Strickland were the first Korean-American women elected. Strickland is also the first Afro-Asian woman elected to the House of Representatives.

Mary Peltola entered the House of Representatives on September 13, 2022, after winning a special election on August 16, as the first Alaska Native person in either chamber of Congress.

Length of service

Representative Marcy Kaptur, who has served in the House since January 3, 1983, has the longest-serving tenure of any female member in the chamber's history. In 2018, she surpassed the record previously held by Edith Nourse Rogers, who served in the House from 1925 until her death in 1960. She went on to surpass the record previously held by Barbara Mikulski, who served in the House and Senate for a combined 40 years, thus making her the longest-serving woman in congressional history.

List of states represented by women

List of territories and the District of Columbia represented by women

Family ties and widow's succession
Winnifred Sprague Mason Huck of Illinois, the third woman ever elected to Congress, became the first woman followed into national office due to family connections. She succeeded her father into the House in the wake of his death in 1921; Huck won a special election to fill out the remainder of his term, but lost a primary election for renomination in her own right, so she served just 14 weeks. In 1990, Rep. Susan Molinari become the first woman elected to fill a vacancy caused by the resignation of her father rather than his death. 

Mae Nolan of California becomes the first woman elected to Congress to fill the vacant seat caused by the death of her husband in 1922, which is sometimes known as the widow's succession. In the early years of women in Congress, such a seat was usually held only until the next general election, and the women retired after that single Congress, thereby becoming a placeholders to finishing elected terms of their husbands. As the years progressed, however, more and more of these widow successors sought reelection. These women began to win their own elections with Florence Prag Kahn of California became the first woman to do so. After entering the House of Representatives in 1925 to replace her late husband, she established herself as an effective legislator in her own right and would go on to win reelection five more times.

To date, 45 women have directly succeeded their late husbands in Congress, with 38 of them seated in the House and eight in the Senate. The only current example is Representative Doris Matsui of California. One of the most prominent examples was Margaret Chase Smith of Maine, who served a total of 32 years in both the House and the Senate and been the first woman to do so. She began the end of McCarthyism with a famous speech, "The Declaration of Conscience", became the first major-party female presidential candidate and the first woman to receive votes at a national nominating convention, and was the first (and highest ranking to date) woman to enter the GOP Senate leadership (in the third-highest post of Chairwoman of the Senate Republican Conference). Rep. Debbie Dingell succeeded her living spouse after his retirement, becoming the first woman to do so. 

Frances P. Bolton of Ohio became the first woman overlapping a tenure with her child in either chamber of Congress. She served alongside her son in the House of Representatives from 1953 to 1957 and again from 1963 to 1965; making them the first mother-son team ever to be simultaneously elected. 

In 1965, Elizabeth Kee of West Virginia became the first woman who directly preceded her own child in any chamber of Congress; event occurred after she stepped down from the House and her son was elected to a vacant seat. Congresswomen Loretta and Linda Sánchez, both of California, served along each other from 2003 to 2017; making them the first pair of sisters elected to either chamber.

Number of women

Number of women in the United States House of Representatives and Senate by Congress

Number of women in the United States Congress (1917–present):

Number of women in the United States House of Representatives by party
Notes: "% of party" is taken from voting members at the beginning of the Congress, while numbers and "% of women" include all female House members of the given Congress

Percentage of women by party and year

List of female members
This is a complete list of women who have served as U.S. representatives or delegates of the United States House of Representatives. Members are grouped by the apportionment period during which such member commenced serving. This list includes women who served in the past and who continue to serve in the present.

Female members whose service began between 1917 and 1932

Female members whose service began between 1933 and 1942

Female members whose service began between 1943 and 1952

Female members whose service began between 1953 and 1962

Female members whose service began between 1963 and 1972

Female members whose service began between 1973 and 1982

Female members whose service began between 1983 and 1992

Female members whose service began between 1993 and 2002

Female members whose service began between 2003 and 2012

Female members whose service began between 2013 and 2022

Female members whose service began between 2023 and present

Current female members

Women who gave birth while serving in the House
There have been 11 women who gave birth while serving in the House at least once during their tenure. Two women gave birth multiple times, each giving birth three times while in office, and one woman gave birth twice while serving in each chamber of Congress.

See also 
 Women in the United States Senate
 List of female governors in the United States
 List of female speakers of legislatures in the United States
 Politics of the United States
 Sexism in American political elections

Notes

References

External links
Women Members by State and Territory - Provided by the United States Congress. Retrieved January 3, 2021.
 Women in Congress  — Companion site to book produced by the Office of the Clerk of the U.S. House of Representatives
 Maurer, Elizabeth. "Legislating History: 100 Years of Women in Congress". National Women's History Museum. 2017.

 
United States House of Representatives
United States House of Representatives
Women
Women